Calaveras Big Trees may refer to:

Calaveras Big Trees State Park, California, U.S.
Calaveras Big Tree National Forest, California, U.S.

See also
 Calaveras (disambiguation)
 Big Trees (disambiguation)